Julianów may refer to:

Julianów, Kutno County in Łódź Voivodeship (central Poland)
Julianów, Łowicz County in Łódź Voivodeship (central Poland)
Julianów, Chełm County in Lublin Voivodeship (east Poland)
Julianów, Opoczno County in Łódź Voivodeship (central Poland)
Julianów, Rawa County in Łódź Voivodeship (central Poland)
Julianów, Tomaszów Mazowiecki County in Łódź Voivodeship (central Poland)
Julianów, Ryki County in Lublin Voivodeship (east Poland)
Julianów, Kielce County in Świętokrzyskie Voivodeship (south-central Poland)
Julianów, Końskie County in Świętokrzyskie Voivodeship (south-central Poland)
Julianów, Gmina Ożarów in Świętokrzyskie Voivodeship (south-central Poland)
Julianów, Gmina Tarłów in Świętokrzyskie Voivodeship (south-central Poland)
Julianów, Gmina Belsk Duży in Masovian Voivodeship (east-central Poland)
Julianów, Gmina Błędów in Masovian Voivodeship (east-central Poland)
Julianów, Mińsk County in Masovian Voivodeship (east-central Poland)
Julianów, Gmina Piaseczno in Masovian Voivodeship (east-central Poland)
Julianów, Gmina Góra Kalwaria in Masovian Voivodeship (east-central Poland)
Julianów, Gmina Tarczyn in Masovian Voivodeship (east-central Poland)
Julianów, Zwoleń County in Masovian Voivodeship (east-central Poland)
Julianów, Silesian Voivodeship (south Poland)